Kothakota is a Municipality and mandal in Wanaparthy district, Telangana. newly formed Municipality in Wanaparthy District The average rainfall is 893 mm per Annum and minimum and maximum temperatures are 20˚c and 43˚c, respectively.

Geography
It has an average elevation of 401 metres (1318 ft).

Demographics 
As of 2011 Census of India, the Kothakota town has a population of 19,042.

Administrative divisions 
Kothakota is under the revenue division of Wanaparthy. Shaik Yasmeen Basha is the present collector of the Wanaparthy district. Alla Venkateswar Reddy is the legislative leader of Devarkadra constituency, Manne Srinivas Reddy is the Member of Mahbubnagar Lok Sabha constituency

Tourist Places 

 Lord Venkatagiri Temple
 Kanayapally Reservoir
 Sarala Sagar Dam
 Pamapuram Shiva temple
 Amadabakula Vekateshwara Swamy temple

Transportation 

Road Transport available to Hyderabad, Kurnool, Thirupathi, Yadagirigutta, Srisailam, Mantralayam, Badrachalam and Mumbai.

National Highway 44 bypass road connected to Kothakota town

References 

Mandals in Wanaparthy district
Census towns in Wanaparthy district